Bishop Morrow School (BMS) is an English medium school in Krishnanagar, Nadia, India. It is situated at Bejikhali crossing. It is a private profit school run by SMI in the district of Nadia. Currently the school is affiliated up to Class X and Class XII(Science and Arts Stream). The school follows the Indian Certificate of Secondary Education Examination (ICSE) & Indian School Certificate Examination (ISC) syllabus.

Foundation 
Bishop Morrow School, Krishnanagar is established and administered by the Registered Society of the Kolkata Province of Catechist Sisters of Mary Immaculate Help of Christians. It is exclusively a Christian Minority institution recognized by the National Commission for Minority Educational Institutions (NCMEI) New Delhi, Government of India and Department of Education of the Government of West Bengal, and is affiliated to Council for the Indian School Certificate Examination, New Delhi, (School Code WB242) for the Indian Certificate of Secondary Education Examination (ICSE), the Indian School Certificate Examination (ISC).

History 
BMS has its humble origin in Nogendangar, Krishnagar, in January 1959 as Mary Immaculate Montessori School, founded by Bishop Louis L.R. Morrow. With the fatherly guidance, care, frequent visits, and blessings of Bishop Morrow and the persistent effort of his congregation of the Sisters of Mary Immaculate, the school kept growing as an English Medium Primary School. On 8 August 1968, Bishop Morrow established, the Young Women's Culture Centre (YWCC) at Bejikhali, Krishnagar, with a plan also for a new School at the site. In October 1968, the Mary Immaculate School at Nogendranagar was shifted to the new spacious building of YWCC, which offers opportunities both for parents and students to enhance their future.

On 15 November 1969, Bishop Morrow retired from Bishopric of Krishnagar after his splendid ministry to his beloved people for 30 long years. As a token of gratitude to the Bishop for his handsome contributions towards the welfare of the city and its people of all faiths, and to promote education and the uplift of women, girls and children, the YWCC was named Bishop Morrow Centre (BMC), at the request of the people, to perpetuate his revered memory. In 2002 it was renamed Bishop Morrow School.

On12thApril 2003, the new school building of Bishop Morrow High School was inaugurated. On 14 October 2003, it obtained the Non- objection Certificate (NOC) from the Government of West Bengal, and on 27 March 2004 affiliation to the Council of New Delhi. In 2005 the first batch of students wrote the ICSE.

On 3 July 2007 BMS obtained NOC for Higher secondary and on 13 May 2008 class XI was introduced with science stream, followed by class XII. On 2 June 2008, the school received permanent affiliation and permission to introduce ISC in the School. In 2010 the first batch of students wrote the ISC.

Current Administration

Gallery

References

External links 
 

Christian schools in West Bengal
Primary schools in West Bengal
High schools and secondary schools in West Bengal
Schools in Nadia district
Krishnanagar
Educational institutions in India with year of establishment missing